Lophotavia is a genus of moths of the family Erebidae. The genus was erected by George Hampson in 1926.

Species
Lophotavia globulipes (Walker, 1865)
Lophotavia incivilis (Walker, 1865)
Lophotavia pulcherrima (Holland, 1894)

References

Calpinae